The Kesen Meteorite is a meteorite that fell on June 13, 1850, landing in a swamp in the outskirts of the City of Rikuzentakata, Kesen District in Iwate Prefecture, Japan.

Classification
It was classified as a H4-type ordinary chondrite.

Main mass
The meteorite was moved to Tokyo where it was held in the Imperial Household Museum. It is currently housed at the National Museum of Nature and Science, Tokyo. A full-scale replica was housed at the Rikuzentakata Municipal Museum until it was lost in the 2011 Tōhoku tsunami.

See also
 Glossary of meteoritics

External links
 Rikuzentakata Municipal Museum

Chondrite meteorites
Meteorites found in Japan